Sandra Daškova (born November 14, 1991, in Tallinn) is an Estonian beauty pageant titleholder. Sandra won the national contest which allowed her to participate in the Miss International 2011.

References

1991 births
Living people
People from Tallinn
Estonian beauty pageant winners
Miss International 2011 delegates
21st-century Estonian women